In electrical engineering, overvoltage is the raising of voltage beyond the design limit of a circuit or circuit element. The conditions may be hazardous.  Depending on its duration, the overvoltage event can be transient—a voltage spike—or permanent, leading to a power surge.

Explanation 

Electronic and electrical devices are designed to operate at a certain maximum supply voltage, and considerable damage can be caused by voltage that is higher than that for which the devices are rated.

For example, an electric light bulb has a wire in it that at the given rated voltage will carry a current just large enough for the wire to get very hot (giving off light and heat), but not hot enough for it to melt. The amount of current in a circuit depends on the voltage supplied: if the voltage is too high, then the wire may melt and the light bulb would have "burned out real time". Similarly other electrical devices may stop working, or may even burst into flames if an overvoltage is delivered to the circuit.

Sources

Natural 
A typical natural source of transient overvoltage events is lightning. Bursts of solar wind following solar flares are also known to cause overvoltage in electrical circuits, especially onboard space satellites.

Man-made 
Man-made sources of spikes are usually caused by electromagnetic induction when switching on or off inductive loads (such as electric motors or electromagnets), or by switching heavy resistive AC loads when zero-crossing circuitry is not used - anywhere a large change of current takes place. One of the purposes of electromagnetic compatibility compliance is to eliminate such sources.

An important potential source of dangerous overvoltage is electronic warfare.  There is intensive military research in this field, whose goal is to produce various transient electromagnetic devices designed to generate electromagnetic pulses that will disable an enemy's electronic equipment.  A recent military development is that of the exploding capacitor designed to radiate a high voltage electromagnetic pulse. Another intense source of an electromagnetic pulse is a nuclear explosion.

When Pacific Gas & Electric Company neglected to trim trees that had grown branches into their high power lines, their system caused the world record overvoltage of any power system so far, of 90 minutes in East Palo Alto California on August 25, 2011.  The overvoltage caused television sets to catch fire and were thrown out the front doors, exploded light bulbs, fried computers, destroyed surge protectors, blew up the smart meters, and sparks shot out of wall outlets.  The overvoltage only ended when the smart meters blew up, or after 90 minutes when the power was physically cut.  The incident was not reported by PG&E to the California PUC, only that there was a day-long "outage" while the exploded system components were being restored.

Conduction path 
The transient pulses can get into the equipment either by power or data lines, or directly through space from a strong electromagnetic field change - an electromagnetic pulse (EMP). Filters are used to prevent spikes entering or leaving the equipment through wires, and the devices coupled electromagnetically to space (such as radio-frequency pick-up coils in MRI scanners) are protected by shielding.

Overvoltage protection devices
 Arcing horns
 Avalanche diode
 Gas-filled tube
 Lightning rod
 Metal-oxide varistor
 Spark gap
 Transient-voltage-suppression diode
 Trisil
 Zener diode

See also

 Crowbar (circuit)
 Electrical fault
 Electronic countermeasure
 Electrostatic discharge
 Overcurrent
 Overvolting
 Undervoltage-lockout
 Uninterruptible power supply

References

External links
Overvoltage protection

Voltage stability